Outcode may refer to:

 the first part of a UK postcode, short for “outward code”
 the region codes used in the Cohen-Sutherland clipping algorithm